The 1984 United States Senate election in Minnesota was held on November 6, 1984. Incumbent Republican U.S. Senator Rudy Boschwitz defeated Democratic challenger Joan Growe.

Boschwitz's victory coincided with President Ronald Reagan's nationwide landslide in the concurrent presidential election in which he defeated Walter Mondale, a Minnesota native, despite Mondale narrowly winning the state.

Major Candidates

Democratic 
Joan Growe, Secretary of State of Minnesota

Republican 
Rudy Boschwitz, incumbent Senator since 1978

Results

See also 
 1984 United States Senate elections

References

1984 Minnesota elections
Minnesota
1984